Tiny Homes Detroit is a development of small, one- and two-person tiny homes constructed for low-income tenants by Cass Community Social Services. The development is located on Elmhurst, Monterey and Richton Street, between Woodrow Wilson and the Lodge Freeway in Detroit. The Lodge Freeway is one of the most trafficked freeways in the Motor City.

History
The Tiny Homes project was started in 2016 by Rev. Faith Fowler, the executive director of Cass Community Social Services, in order to address asset inequality and create a financial safety net for working poor people in Detroit. The lots are located just west of the Lodge Freeway and only a few blocks north of the Cass headquarters at 11850 Woodrow Wilson. Cass Community Social Services raised money from numerous sources for the project, with an estimated total budget of $1.5 million. Donors included Ford, Jon Bon Jovi, General Motors, staffing agency Epitec, and the Birmingham First United Methodist Church.

A model home was constructed in late 2016, and the first six homes in the development were completed by early 2017. Nineteen homes were completed by 2019. Additional larger homes for families are planned in the future.

Usage
The homes in the development are slated for low-income tenants making as little as $8,000 per year, with the intent to both address housing needs and set low-income tenant on the path to home ownership. The homes are rent-to-own, with tenants taking ownership after a seven-year period. Tenants applying for the program also agree to meet with a financial coach, attend financial literacy classes, and volunteer on neighborhood projects.

When the first six homes were completed in 2017, 122 people applied for tenancy. Applicants were anonymously rated using a numerical scoring system, which factored in residential history, financial readiness, and personal references. The first tenants ranged in age from 24 to 74, and earn an average income of $988 a month.

Description
Tiny Homes Detroit is located along three streets (Elmhurst, Monterey and Richton), between Woodrow Wilson and the Lodge Freeway.The development will contain 25 homes when completed. Houses are located on  lots, so each has a back yard. 

The homes are unique, with distinctive colors and design elements. Architectural styles range from cottages to Colonial, Victorian, Tudor, and an environmental house, with each house being different. Each home contains appliances, a bed, sofa and dining table, and is solar powered. Several have porches or patios.

References

Further reading

Community-building organizations
Social welfare charities based in the United States
Organizations based in Detroit